The ÚVMV 1100 GT (or Škoda 1100 GT) is a coupé car from AZNP made in 1970.

It was exhibited at Plzeň Expo and the next year at the Geneva Motor Show. Internal dimensions and seating position were developed from the Saab Sonett II, Glas 1300 GT and Alfa Romeo GT Junior. Unlike the Saab it used the rear-engine, rear-wheel drive layout. It was powered by a modified Škoda 110 A2 engine.

Only seven were ever built, three of them have registration numbers of the Nový Jičín District and two were variously rebuilt. It was the opponent of the Škoda 110 Super Sport Ferat.

Specifications 
 wheelbase: 
 size:  x  x 
 weight: 
 tyre: 14" Metzeler Monza 155 SR
 motor: modified Škoda 110 A2, dual carburettor Weber 40 DCOE2
 displacement: 1,140 cc
 max power: 
 top speed: 
 0–100 km/h (62 mph): 13.7 seconds

References

External links
 web.daves.cz
 retro.femat.cz (In Czech)

Rear-engined vehicles
1100 Gt